Twila Hinkle (born November 9, 1954) is an American cross-country skier. She competed in two events at the 1976 Winter Olympics.

References

External links
 

1954 births
Living people
American female cross-country skiers
Olympic cross-country skiers of the United States
Cross-country skiers at the 1976 Winter Olympics
Skiers from Denver
21st-century American women